Mazury, or Masuria, is a region in north Poland.

Mazury may also refer to:
Mazury (horse), a breed of horse
Mazury, Greater Poland Voivodeship, a village in west-central Poland
Mazury, Łódź Voivodeship, a village in central Poland
Mazury, Podlaskie Voivodeship, a village in north-east Poland
Mazury, Silesian Voivodeship, a village in south Poland 
Mazury, Subcarpathian Voivodeship (aka Podkarpackie Voivodeship), a village in south-east Poland
Mazury, Warmian-Masurian Voivodeship, a village in north Poland

See also
, a cargo ship in service 1935–64
, a Polish pre-war torpedo boat